"Do It to Me" is a song by American singer Lionel Richie. The song was written by Richie, and produced by himself and Stewart Levine. It was the first single from his first compilation album, Back to Front and was released in 1992 by Motown Records. The song spent one week at number one on the US Billboard Hot R&B/Hip-Hop Songs chart and peaked at number 21 on the Billboard Hot 100. "Do It to Me" also achieved some success in European countries, becoming a top ten hit in France and Norway. The song samples the drum break "Sneakin' in the Back" by Tom Scott.

Critical reception
Bryan Buss from AllMusic described the song as "classic, smooth Richie". A reviewer from Cashbox wrote, "This is quite a surprise. Lionel Richie is back and in full thrust with the first single taken off his upcoming Back To Front album." The reviewer added, "Being away from the industry for such a long period of time, you would think that he would be a little "rusty", but listening to this single, one can hear an improvement in his entire sound. Put a catchy beat, some nice chords and melodies to a legend's vocals, and you have a hit." Bill Wyman from Entertainment Weekly called it "a pallid single".

Track listings
 CD single / 7" single
 "Do It to Me" (single radio edit) – 4:37
 "Ballerina Girl" – 3:35

 CD maxi
 "Do It to Me" (single radio edit)
 "Do It to Me" (instrumental)
 "Do It to Me" (extended version)
 "Ballerina Girl"

Charts

Weekly charts

Year-end charts

See also
List of number-one R&B singles of 1992 (U.S.)

References

1990s ballads
1992 songs
1992 singles
Lionel Richie songs
Music videos directed by Michael Bay
Songs written by Lionel Richie
Motown singles
Contemporary R&B ballads
Quiet storm songs